Frank Prescott Norton  (June 9, 1845 – August 1, 1920) was an American professional baseball player, who played in one game for the Washington Olympics on May 5, 1871. He struck out in his only at-bat and played third base and outfield in the game.

References

External links

Major League Baseball outfielders
Major League Baseball third basemen
Washington Nationals (NABBP) players
Washington Olympics (NABBP) players
Washington Olympics players
Baseball players from New York (state)
People from Port Jefferson, New York
19th-century baseball players
1845 births
1920 deaths